KUNO (1400 AM, El Patron) is a radio station broadcasting a Spanish adult hits music format. Licensed to Corpus Christi, Texas, United States. The station is currently owned by iHeartMedia, Inc.  The station's studios and offices are located on Old Brownsville Road in Corpus Christi (near the airport, and its transmitter tower is located in the Central City part of the city.

References

External links
iheart Corpus Christi radio stations

UNO
Radio stations established in 1993
1993 establishments in Texas
IHeartMedia radio stations
Adult hits radio stations in the United States